The White Line is a 1950 Italian drama film directed by Luigi Zampa and starring Gina Lollobrigida, Raf Vallone and Erno Crisa.

The film's sets were designed by the art director Aldo Buzzi. Some location shooting took place in the Free Territory of Trieste, located between Italy and Tito's Yugoslavia.

Plot

Cast
 Gina Lollobrigida as Donata Sebastian
 Raf Vallone as Domenico
 Erno Crisa as Stefano
 Cesco Baseggio as Giovanni Sebastian
 Enzo Staiola as Pasqualino Sebastian
 Ernesto Almirante as The Grandfather
 Gino Cavalieri as The Priest
 Fabio Neri as Gaspare
 Mario Sestan as Lampadina
 Antonio Catania as Acquasanta
 Giordano Cesini as Cacciavitte
 Callisto Cosulich as Soviet Officer
 Tullio Kezich as Yugoslav Lieutenant
 Piero Grego as US Army Sergeant
 Gianni Cavalieri as Pentecoste

References

Bibliography
 Chiti, Roberto & Poppi, Roberto. Dizionario del cinema italiano: Dal 1945 al 1959. Gremese Editore, 1991.

External links

1950 films
1950s Italian-language films
1950 drama films
Italian black-and-white films
Films directed by Luigi Zampa
Films produced by Carlo Ponti
Films scored by Carlo Rustichelli
Italian drama films
Lux Film films
1950s Italian films